The 1977 VFL season was the 81st season of the Victorian Football League (VFL), the highest level senior Australian rules football competition in Victoria. The season featured twelve clubs, ran from 2 April until 1 October, and comprised a 22-game home-and-away season followed by a finals series featuring the top five clubs.

The premiership was won by the North Melbourne Football Club for the second time, after it defeated  by 27 points in the 1977 VFL Grand Final replay.

Night series
 defeated  14.11 (95) to 11.5 (71) in the final.

Premiership season

Round 1

|- bgcolor="#CCCCFF"
| Home team
| Home team score
| Away team
| Away team score
| Venue
| Crowd
| Date
|- bgcolor="#FFFFFF"
| 
| 10.12 (72)
| 
| 21.15 (141)
| MCG
| 22,049
| 2 April 1977
|- bgcolor="#FFFFFF"
| 
| 13.14 (92)
| 
| 23.14 (152)
| Princes Park
| 20,317
| 2 April 1977
|- bgcolor="#FFFFFF"
| 
| 21.17 (143)
| 
| 18.21 (129)
| Junction Oval
| 17,740
| 2 April 1977
|- bgcolor="#FFFFFF"
| 
| 14.25 (109)
| 
| 10.17 (77)
| Windy Hill
| 17,265
| 2 April 1977
|- bgcolor="#FFFFFF"
| 
| 19.16 (130)
| 
| 18.11 (119)
| Victoria Park
| 27,377
| 2 April 1977
|- bgcolor="#FFFFFF"
| 
| 6.9 (45)
| 
| 17.21 (123)
| Kardinia Park
| 25,317
| 2 April 1977

Round 2

|- bgcolor="#CCCCFF"
| Home team
| Home team score
| Away team
| Away team score
| Venue
| Crowd
| Date
|- bgcolor="#FFFFFF"
| 
| 16.17 (113)
| 
| 12.9 (81)
| Princes Park
| 25,173
| 9 April 1977
|- bgcolor="#FFFFFF"
| 
| 27.13 (175)
| 
| 15.8 (98)
| Lake Oval
| 23,000
| 9 April 1977
|- bgcolor="#FFFFFF"
| 
| 16.6 (102)
| 
| 13.15 (93)
| Arden Street Oval
| 28,073
| 9 April 1977
|- bgcolor="#FFFFFF"
| 
| 18.8 (116)
| 
| 12.23 (95)
| Western Oval
| 18,295
| 11 April 1977
|- bgcolor="#FFFFFF"
| 
| 19.6 (120)
| 
| 17.17 (119)
| MCG
| 42,192
| 11 April 1977
|- bgcolor="#FFFFFF"
| 
| 11.17 (83)
| 
| 17.17 (119)
| Moorabbin Oval
| 20,338
| 11 April 1977

Round 3

|- bgcolor="#CCCCFF"
| Home team
| Home team score
| Away team
| Away team score
| Venue
| Crowd
| Date
|- bgcolor="#FFFFFF"
| 
| 14.18 (102)
| 
| 16.9 (105)
| MCG
| 19,543
| 16 April 1977
|- bgcolor="#FFFFFF"
| 
| 6.14 (50)
| 
| 15.15 (105)
| Kardinia Park
| 19,336
| 16 April 1977
|- bgcolor="#FFFFFF"
| 
| 24.22 (166)
| 
| 16.19 (115)
| Victoria Park
| 26,210
| 16 April 1977
|- bgcolor="#FFFFFF"
| 
| 24.26 (170)
| 
| 9.9 (63)
| Princes Park
| 19,336
| 16 April 1977
|- bgcolor="#FFFFFF"
| 
| 11.13 (79)
| 
| 13.13 (91)
| Lake Oval
| 25,768
| 16 April 1977
|- bgcolor="#FFFFFF"
| 
| 20.16 (136)
| 
| 16.12 (108)
| VFL Park
| 17,415
| 16 April 1977

Round 4

|- bgcolor="#CCCCFF"
| Home team
| Home team score
| Away team
| Away team score
| Venue
| Crowd
| Date
|- bgcolor="#FFFFFF"
| 
| 19.10 (124)
| 
| 16.24 (120)
| Windy Hill
| 14,529
| 23 April 1977
|- bgcolor="#FFFFFF"
| 
| 16.21 (117)
| 
| 12.10 (82)
| Arden Street Oval
| 17,239
| 23 April 1977
|- bgcolor="#FFFFFF"
| 
| 19.20 (134)
| 
| 14.14 (98)
| Moorabbin Oval
| 13,401
| 23 April 1977
|- bgcolor="#FFFFFF"
| 
| 13.18 (96)
| 
| 12.11 (83)
| Princes Park
| 32,135
| 23 April 1977
|- bgcolor="#FFFFFF"
| 
| 14.16 (100)
| 
| 17.24 (126)
| MCG
| 91,936
| 25 April 1977
|- bgcolor="#FFFFFF"
| 
| 12.15 (87)
| 
| 16.18 (114)
| VFL Park
| 27,136
| 25 April 1977

Round 5

|- bgcolor="#CCCCFF"
| Home team
| Home team score
| Away team
| Away team score
| Venue
| Crowd
| Date
|- bgcolor="#FFFFFF"
| 
| 13.24 (102)
| 
| 19.17 (131)
| MCG
| 22,272
| 30 April 1977
|- bgcolor="#FFFFFF"
| 
| 17.14 (116)
| 
| 17.14 (116)
| Western Oval
| 15,453
| 30 April 1977
|- bgcolor="#FFFFFF"
| 
| 12.14 (86)
| 
| 21.16 (142)
| Junction Oval
| 10,428
| 30 April 1977
|- bgcolor="#FFFFFF"
| 
| 18.16 (124)
| 
| 15.19 (109)
| Victoria Park
| 24,281
| 30 April 1977
|- bgcolor="#FFFFFF"
| 
| 21.8 (134)
| 
| 16.11 (107)
| Princes Park
| 21,533
| 30 April 1977
|- bgcolor="#FFFFFF"
| 
| 18.17 (125)
| 
| 15.15 (105)
| VFL Park
| 22,323
| 30 April 1977

Round 6

|- bgcolor="#CCCCFF"
| Home team
| Home team score
| Away team
| Away team score
| Venue
| Crowd
| Date
|- bgcolor="#FFFFFF"
| 
| 25.41 (191)
| 
| 16.7 (103)
| Princes Park
| 11,918
| 7 May 1977
|- bgcolor="#FFFFFF"
| 
| 21.17 (143)
| 
| 13.15 (93)
| Kardinia Park
| 17,219
| 7 May 1977
|- bgcolor="#FFFFFF"
| 
| 13.11 (89)
| 
| 29.15 (189)
| Windy Hill
| 19,399
| 7 May 1977
|- bgcolor="#FFFFFF"
| 
| 19.15 (129)
| 
| 14.12 (96)
| MCG
| 34,408
| 7 May 1977
|- bgcolor="#FFFFFF"
| 
| 21.19 (145)
| 
| 19.12 (126)
| Lake Oval
| 11,802
| 7 May 1977
|- bgcolor="#FFFFFF"
| 
| 22.20 (152)
| 
| 7.8 (50)
| VFL Park
| 64,256
| 7 May 1977

Round 7

|- bgcolor="#CCCCFF"
| Home team
| Home team score
| Away team
| Away team score
| Venue
| Crowd
| Date
|- bgcolor="#FFFFFF"
| 
| 14.14 (98)
| 
| 14.14 (98)
| Moorabbin Oval
| 18,563
| 14 May 1977
|- bgcolor="#FFFFFF"
| 
| 8.13 (61)
| 
| 20.11 (131)
| Western Oval
| 17,935
| 14 May 1977
|- bgcolor="#FFFFFF"
| 
| 23.11 (149)
| 
| 12.12 (84)
| Arden Street Oval
| 17,259
| 14 May 1977
|- bgcolor="#FFFFFF"
| 
| 11.14 (80)
| 
| 15.23 (113)
| Junction Oval
| 20,735
| 14 May 1977
|- bgcolor="#FFFFFF"
| 
| 14.12 (96)
| 
| 16.20 (116)
| MCG
| 27,456
| 14 May 1977
|- bgcolor="#FFFFFF"
| 
| 15.9 (99)
| 
| 14.15 (99)
| VFL Park
| 32,326
| 14 May 1977

Round 8

|- bgcolor="#CCCCFF"
| Home team
| Home team score
| Away team
| Away team score
| Venue
| Crowd
| Date
|- bgcolor="#FFFFFF"
| 
| 19.21 (135)
| 
| 11.12 (78)
| Victoria Park
| 21,598
| 21 May 1977
|- bgcolor="#FFFFFF"
| 
| 8.17 (65)
| 
| 9.8 (62)
| Princes Park
| 22,364
| 21 May 1977
|- bgcolor="#FFFFFF"
| 
| 7.13 (55)
| 
| 18.7 (115)
| Lake Oval
| 11,443
| 21 May 1977
|- bgcolor="#FFFFFF"
| 
| 16.18 (114)
| 
| 13.17 (95)
| MCG
| 21,519
| 21 May 1977
|- bgcolor="#FFFFFF"
| 
| 13.16 (94)
| 
| 13.9 (87)
| Kardinia Park
| 15,674
| 21 May 1977
|- bgcolor="#FFFFFF"
| 
| 19.26 (140)
| 
| 14.8 (92)
| VFL Park
| 11,259
| 21 May 1977

Round 9

|- bgcolor="#CCCCFF"
| Home team
| Home team score
| Away team
| Away team score
| Venue
| Crowd
| Date
|- bgcolor="#FFFFFF"
| 
| 18.19 (127)
| 
| 20.12 (132)
| Moorabbin Oval
| 15,254
| 28 May 1977
|- bgcolor="#FFFFFF"
| 
| 14.14 (98)
| 
| 11.13 (79)
| Lake Oval
| 12,104
| 28 May 1977
|- bgcolor="#FFFFFF"
| 
| 12.12 (84)
| 
| 10.14 (74)
| Arden Street Oval
| 8,940
| 28 May 1977
|- bgcolor="#FFFFFF"
| 
| 16.12 (108)
| 
| 22.10 (142)
| Princes Park
| 34,727
| 28 May 1977
|- bgcolor="#FFFFFF"
| 
| 14.12 (96)
| 
| 10.17 (77)
| Windy Hill
| 23,224
| 28 May 1977
|- bgcolor="#FFFFFF"
| 
| 18.13 (121)
| 
| 10.11 (71)
| VFL Park
| 26,007
| 28 May 1977

Round 10

|- bgcolor="#CCCCFF"
| Home team
| Home team score
| Away team
| Away team score
| Venue
| Crowd
| Date
|- bgcolor="#FFFFFF"
| 
| 21.14 (140)
| 
| 15.13 (103)
| Western Oval
| 15,093
| 4 June 1977
|- bgcolor="#FFFFFF"
| 
| 15.20 (110)
| 
| 20.16 (136)
| Victoria Park
| 24,309
| 4 June 1977
|- bgcolor="#FFFFFF"
| 
| 16.9 (105)
| 
| 19.11 (125)
| Princes Park
| 28,556
| 4 June 1977
|- bgcolor="#FFFFFF"
| 
| 16.19 (115)
| 
| 19.13 (127)
| MCG
| 21,586
| 4 June 1977
|- bgcolor="#FFFFFF"
| 
| 14.16 (100)
| 
| 23.16 (154)
| Junction Oval
| 13,150
| 4 June 1977
|- bgcolor="#FFFFFF"
| 
| 21.16 (142)
| 
| 7.15 (57)
| VFL Park
| 19,199
| 4 June 1977

Round 11

|- bgcolor="#CCCCFF"
| Home team
| Home team score
| Away team
| Away team score
| Venue
| Crowd
| Date
|- bgcolor="#FFFFFF"
| 
| 12.9 (81)
| 
| 9.11 (65)
| Lake Oval
| 20,785
| 11 June 1977
|- bgcolor="#FFFFFF"
| 
| 20.13 (133)
| 
| 11.16 (82)
| Kardinia Park
| 14,664
| 11 June 1977
|- bgcolor="#FFFFFF"
| 
| 17.14 (116)
| 
| 8.19 (67)
| VFL Park
| 25,745
| 11 June 1977
|- bgcolor="#FFFFFF"
| 
| 13.10 (88)
| 
| 16.5 (101)
| Moorabbin Oval
| 23,979
| 13 June 1977
|- bgcolor="#FFFFFF"
| 
| 23.25 (163)
| 
| 8.9 (57)
| Princes Park
| 25,609
| 13 June 1977
|- bgcolor="#FFFFFF"
| 
| 11.20 (86)
| 
| 17.17 (119)
| MCG
| 63,188
| 13 June 1977

Round 12

|- bgcolor="#CCCCFF"
| Home team
| Home team score
| Away team
| Away team score
| Venue
| Crowd
| Date
|- bgcolor="#FFFFFF"
| 
| 3.13 (31)
| 
| 2.12 (24)
| Princes Park
| 11,009
| 18 June 1977
|- bgcolor="#FFFFFF"
| 
| 8.22 (70)
| 
| 9.10 (64)
| Lake Oval
| 20,785
| 18 June 1977
|- bgcolor="#FFFFFF"
| 
| 6.11 (47)
| 
| 6.12 (48)
| Arden Street Oval
| 9,027
| 18 June 1977
|- bgcolor="#FFFFFF"
| 
| 13.15 (93)
| 
| 6.5 (41)
| MCG
| 12,877
| 18 June 1977
|- bgcolor="#FFFFFF"
| 
| 5.6 (36)
| 
| 9.15 (69)
| Western Oval
| 11,921
| 18 June 1977
|- bgcolor="#FFFFFF"
| 
| 5.12 (42)
| 
| 5.16 (46)
| VFL Park
| 14,337
| 18 June 1977

Round 13

|- bgcolor="#CCCCFF"
| Home team
| Home team score
| Away team
| Away team score
| Venue
| Crowd
| Date
|- bgcolor="#FFFFFF"
| 
| 11.9 (75)
| 
| 12.13 (85)
| Kardinia Park
| 13,033
| 25 June 1977
|- bgcolor="#FFFFFF"
| 
| 9.9 (63)
| 
| 6.15 (51)
| Windy Hill
| 16,309
| 25 June 1977
|- bgcolor="#FFFFFF"
| 
| 13.19 (97)
| 
| 8.8 (56)
| Victoria Park
| 28,079
| 25 June 1977
|- bgcolor="#FFFFFF"
| 
| 7.9 (51)
| 
| 15.12 (102)
| MCG
| 12,566
| 25 June 1977
|- bgcolor="#FFFFFF"
| 
| 11.9 (75)
| 
| 9.14 (68)
| Junction Oval
| 10,850
| 25 June 1977
|- bgcolor="#FFFFFF"
| 
| 9.12 (66)
| 
| 7.10 (52)
| VFL Park
| 34,820
| 25 June 1977

Round 14

|- bgcolor="#CCCCFF"
| Home team
| Home team score
| Away team
| Away team score
| Venue
| Crowd
| Date
|- bgcolor="#FFFFFF"
| 
| 7.15 (57)
| 
| 9.10 (64)
| Kardinia Park
| 14,933
| 2 July 1977
|- bgcolor="#FFFFFF"
| 
| 9.10 (64)
| 
| 11.15 (81)
| Western Oval
| 17,151
| 2 July 1977
|- bgcolor="#FFFFFF"
| 
| 22.9 (141)
| 
| 11.12 (78)
| Victoria Park
| 32,833
| 2 July 1977
|- bgcolor="#FFFFFF"
| 
| 9.8 (62)
| 
| 7.6 (48)
| Princes Park
| 24,520
| 2 July 1977
|- bgcolor="#FFFFFF"
| 
| 9.16 (70)
| 
| 8.11 (59)
| MCG
| 21,473
| 2 July 1977
|- bgcolor="#FFFFFF"
| 
| 10.12 (72)
| 
| 14.12 (96)
| VFL Park
| 17,028
| 2 July 1977

Round 15

|- bgcolor="#CCCCFF"
| Home team
| Home team score
| Away team
| Away team score
| Venue
| Crowd
| Date
|- bgcolor="#FFFFFF"
| 
| 15.13 (103)
| 
| 11.19 (85)
| Junction Oval
| 8,680
| 9 July 1977
|- bgcolor="#FFFFFF"
| 
| 18.19 (127)
| 
| 11.10 (76)
| Arden Street Oval
| 11,253
| 9 July 1977
|- bgcolor="#FFFFFF"
| 
| 28.23 (191)
| 
| 13.6 (84)
| Princes Park
| 21,391
| 9 July 1977
|- bgcolor="#FFFFFF"
| 
| 14.19 (103)
| 
| 17.12 (114)
| Windy Hill
| 27,042
| 9 July 1977
|- bgcolor="#FFFFFF"
| 
| 17.12 (114)
| 
| 18.14 (122)
| Moorabbin Oval
| 8,120
| 9 July 1977
|- bgcolor="#FFFFFF"
| 
| 14.16 (100)
| 
| 10.11 (71)
| VFL Park
| 34,291
| 9 July 1977

Round 16

|- bgcolor="#CCCCFF"
| Home team
| Home team score
| Away team
| Away team score
| Venue
| Crowd
| Date
|- bgcolor="#FFFFFF"
| 
| 17.14 (116)
| 
| 11.11 (77)
| Windy Hill
| 17,489
| 16 July 1977
|- bgcolor="#FFFFFF"
| 
| 10.11 (71)
| 
| 13.12 (90)
| MCG
| 19,075
| 16 July 1977
|- bgcolor="#FFFFFF"
| 
| 10.16 (76)
| 
| 13.18 (96)
| Moorabbin Oval
| 12,659
| 16 July 1977
|- bgcolor="#FFFFFF"
| 
| 20.14 (134)
| 
| 11.12 (78)
| Princes Park
| 8,200
| 16 July 1977
|- bgcolor="#FFFFFF"
| 
| 12.4 (76)
| 
| 13.7 (85)
| Lake Oval
| 17,058
| 16 July 1977
|- bgcolor="#FFFFFF"
| 
| 16.6 (102)
| 
| 12.25 (97)
| VFL Park
| 26,029
| 16 July 1977

Round 17

|- bgcolor="#CCCCFF"
| Home team
| Home team score
| Away team
| Away team score
| Venue
| Crowd
| Date
|- bgcolor="#FFFFFF"
| 
| 15.11 (101)
| 
| 14.14 (98)
| Arden Street Oval
| 15,359
| 23 July 1977
|- bgcolor="#FFFFFF"
| 
| 7.13 (55)
| 
| 16.21 (117)
| Junction Oval
| 10,220
| 23 July 1977
|- bgcolor="#FFFFFF"
| 
| 11.8 (74)
| 
| 15.16 (106)
| Princes Park
| 38,220
| 23 July 1977
|- bgcolor="#FFFFFF"
| 
| 15.18 (108)
| 
| 20.14 (134)
| MCG
| 15,890
| 23 July 1977
|- bgcolor="#FFFFFF"
| 
| 12.21 (93)
| 
| 11.10 (76)
| Western Oval
| 17,834
| 23 July 1977
|- bgcolor="#FFFFFF"
| 
| 11.11 (77)
| 
| 24.19 (163)
| VFL Park
| 20,469
| 23 July 1977

Round 18

|- bgcolor="#CCCCFF"
| Home team
| Home team score
| Away team
| Away team score
| Venue
| Crowd
| Date
|- bgcolor="#FFFFFF"
| 
| 6.15 (51)
| 
| 14.11 (95)
| Kardinia Park
| 17,898
| 30 July 1977
|- bgcolor="#FFFFFF"
| 
| 18.14 (122)
| 
| 13.11 (89)
| Victoria Park
| 16,885
| 30 July 1977
|- bgcolor="#FFFFFF"
| 
| 21.12 (138)
| 
| 12.11 (83)
| Lake Oval
| 13,906
| 30 July 1977
|- bgcolor="#FFFFFF"
| 
| 18.10 (118)
| 
| 15.14 (104)
| Princes Park
| 10,420
| 30 July 1977
|- bgcolor="#FFFFFF"
| 
| 16.15 (111)
| 
| 9.11 (65)
| MCG
| 33,085
| 30 July 1977
|- bgcolor="#FFFFFF"
| 
| 17.11 (113)
| 
| 7.4 (46)
| VFL Park
| 18,852
| 30 July 1977

Round 19

|- bgcolor="#CCCCFF"
| Home team
| Home team score
| Away team
| Away team score
| Venue
| Crowd
| Date
|- bgcolor="#FFFFFF"
| 
| 19.15 (129)
| 
| 15.11 (101)
| Western Oval
| 16,897
| 6 August 1977
|- bgcolor="#FFFFFF"
| 
| 23.8 (146)
| 
| 12.12 (84)
| Junction Oval
| 7,475
| 6 August 1977
|- bgcolor="#FFFFFF"
| 
| 15.20 (110)
| 
| 18.16 (124)
| Windy Hill
| 13,664
| 6 August 1977
|- bgcolor="#FFFFFF"
| 
| 11.9 (75)
| 
| 14.17 (101)
| Moorabbin Oval
| 21,876
| 6 August 1977
|- bgcolor="#FFFFFF"
| 
| 8.15 (63)
| 
| 6.7 (43)
| Arden Street Oval
| 22,160
| 6 August 1977
|- bgcolor="#FFFFFF"
| 
| 10.18 (78)
| 
| 16.7 (103)
| VFL Park
| 31,253
| 6 August 1977

Round 20

|- bgcolor="#CCCCFF"
| Home team
| Home team score
| Away team
| Away team score
| Venue
| Crowd
| Date
|- bgcolor="#FFFFFF"
| 
| 27.13 (175)
| 
| 15.14 (104)
| MCG
| 12,967
| 13 August 1977
|- bgcolor="#FFFFFF"
| 
| 5.16 (46)
| 
| 19.18 (132)
| Kardinia Park
| 17,081
| 13 August 1977
|- bgcolor="#FFFFFF"
| 
| 9.19 (73)
| 
| 14.12 (96)
| Western Oval
| 18,514
| 13 August 1977
|- bgcolor="#FFFFFF"
| 
| 13.21 (99)
| 
| 15.15 (105)
| Victoria Park
| 30,184
| 13 August 1977
|- bgcolor="#FFFFFF"
| 
| 22.14 (146)
| 
| 16.15 (111)
| Princes Park
| 20,120
| 13 August 1977
|- bgcolor="#FFFFFF"
| 
| 9.11 (65)
| 
| 10.19 (79)
| VFL Park
| 12,350
| 13 August 1977

Round 21

|- bgcolor="#CCCCFF"
| Home team
| Home team score
| Away team
| Away team score
| Venue
| Crowd
| Date
|- bgcolor="#FFFFFF"
| 
| 16.14 (110)
| 
| 14.15 (99)
| Princes Park
| 8,850
| 20 August 1977
|- bgcolor="#FFFFFF"
| 
| 10.13 (73)
| 
| 20.17 (137)
| Windy Hill
| 10,180
| 20 August 1977
|- bgcolor="#FFFFFF"
| 
| 11.12 (78)
| 
| 15.16 (106)
| Moorabbin Oval
| 11,506
| 20 August 1977
|- bgcolor="#FFFFFF"
| 
| 8.9 (57)
| 
| 12.17 (89)
| Lake Oval
| 29,186
| 20 August 1977
|- bgcolor="#FFFFFF"
| 
| 15.13 (103)
| 
| 14.16 (100)
| MCG
| 49,134
| 20 August 1977
|- bgcolor="#FFFFFF"
| 
| 10.8 (68)
| 
| 11.19 (85)
| VFL Park
| 11,010
| 20 August 1977

Round 22

|- bgcolor="#CCCCFF"
| Home team
| Home team score
| Away team
| Away team score
| Venue
| Crowd
| Date
|- bgcolor="#FFFFFF"
| 
| 25.21 (171)
| 
| 17.10 (112)
| MCG
| 24,122
| 27 August 1977
|- bgcolor="#FFFFFF"
| 
| 14.9 (93)
| 
| 15.13 (103)
| Arden Street Oval
| 19,102
| 27 August 1977
|- bgcolor="#FFFFFF"
| 
| 19.27 (141)
| 
| 14.16 (100)
| Junction Oval
| 7,644
| 27 August 1977
|- bgcolor="#FFFFFF"
| 
| 19.16 (130)
| 
| 25.18 (168)
| Windy Hill
| 14,325
| 27 August 1977
|- bgcolor="#FFFFFF"
| 
| 15.13 (103)
| 
| 12.13 (85)
| Western Oval
| 22,426
| 27 August 1977
|- bgcolor="#FFFFFF"
| 
| 17.13 (115)
| 
| 14.17 (101)
| VFL Park
| 36,306
| 27 August 1977

Ladder

Finals

Elimination final

Qualifying final

|- bgcolor="#CCCCFF"
| Home team
| Score
| Away team
| Score
| Venue
| Crowd
| Date
|- bgcolor="#FFFFFF"
| 
| 19.11 (125)
| 
| 12.15 (87)
| MCG
| 64,068
| 3 September
|- bgcolor="#FFFFFF"

Semi finals

|- bgcolor="#CCCCFF"
| Home team
| Score
| Away team
| Score
| Venue
| Crowd
| Date
|- bgcolor="#FFFFFF"
| 
| 16.14 (110)
| 
| 9.9 (63)
| VFL Park
| 48,105
| 10 September
|- bgcolor="#FFFFFF"
| 
| 17.10 (112)
| 
| 16.14 (110)
| MCG
| 87,421
| 10 September

Preliminary final

|- bgcolor="#CCCCFF"
| Home team
| Score
| Away team
| Score
| Venue
| Crowd
| Date
|- bgcolor="#FFFFFF"
| 
| 5.15 (45)
| 
| 16.16 (112)
| VFL Park
| 61,242
| 17 September

Grand final

North Melbourne drew with Collingwood 9.22 (76) to 10.16 (76), in front of a crowd of 108,244 people.

|- bgcolor="#CCCCFF"
| Game
| Home team
| Home team score
| Away team
| Away team score
| Venue
| Crowd
| Date
|- bgcolor="#FFFFFF"
| Grand final
| 
|  9.22 (76)
| 
| 10.16 (76)
| MCG
| 108,224
| 24 September 1977

Grand final replay
A replay was held, and North Melbourne defeated Collingwood 21.25 (151) to 19.10 (124) in front of a crowd of 98,491 people. (For an explanation of scoring see Australian rules football).

|- bgcolor="#CCCCFF"
| Game
| Home team
| Home team score
| Away team
| Away team score
| Venue
| Crowd
| Date
|- bgcolor="#FFFFFF"
| Grand final
| 
|  19.10 (124)
| 
|  21.25 (151)
| MCG
| 98,491
| 1 October 1977

Awards
 The Coleman Medal was won by Peter Hudson of Hawthorn with 105 goals
 The Brownlow Medal was won by Graham Teasdale of South Melbourne.  
Richmond 19.18 (132) defeated  10.15 (75) in the grand final, held as a curtain-raiser to the seniors grand final at the Melbourne Cricket Ground on 24 September.

Notable events
 Hawthorn's round 6 victory over St Kilda set the following records – 41 behinds (previous highest 34) and 66 scoring shots (previous highest 60). 13 different Hawthorn players kicked a behind – still a VFL/AFL record.
 For the only time in VFL/AFL history, two players from one team – Peter Hudson (110) and Leigh Matthews (91) of Hawthorn – combined for over 200 goals in one season. Additionally, it was the first time since 1906 that one club produced the top two leading goalkickers in a season.
 In the Round 15 game against Geelong, Hawthorn had three players – Hudson with eight, John Hendrie with eight, and Leigh Matthews with seven – kick seven or more goals in one match. This has been repeated only by Fitzroy with Matthew Rendell, Bernie Quinlan and Michael Conlan in 1983 against North Melbourne.
 In shocking conditions in Round 12, Carlton and Geelong played the first match since the 1927 Grand Final where both teams scored three or fewer goals. Both teams' scores were lower than any score from any other game during 1977. In the same round, North Melbourne's Malcolm Blight missed a set shot for goal after the final siren at the Arden Street Oval, which resulted in Hawthorn winning the game.
 In Round 16, Geelong beat Collingwood despite having fifteen fewer scoring shots. This equalled Richmond's record against Fitzroy from 1957.
 In the Reserve and Under-19 Grades, the appalling weather of mid- to late June caused the only cancellation (as opposed to postponement) of matches in VFL/AFL history until 2015. These cancellations affected Round 14 in the Reserves and Round 13 in the Under-19s.
 South Melbourne played in its last finals series before relocating to Sydney, as well as its first final series since 1970, and only its second since the infamous 1945 "bloodbath" grand final.
 St Kilda "won" its nineteenth wooden spoon and first since 1955. With the club having finished last 27 times since 1897, this twenty-two year gap is the longest between spoons for the club. 
 Collingwood became the first VFL/AFL team to win the Minor Premiership after winning the wooden spoon the year before.
 As of 2022, North Melbourne is the only team to play twenty-seven premiership matches in a VFL/AFL season. John Cassin was the only player to play in all 27 matches.

See also
 McIntyre "final five" system

References

 Stephen Rogers and Ashley Brown (1998). Every Game Ever Played. 6th ed. Victoria: Penguin Books.

Australian Football League seasons
VFL season